Donetsk Republic can refer to:
Donetsk–Krivoy Rog Soviet Republic – a Soviet republic of the Russian SFSR founded on 1918 
Donetsk Republic (political party) – a political party
Donetsk People's Republic – a self-proclaimed breakaway state in Donetsk Oblast, Ukraine